Aylesbury Vale Parkway railway station is a railway station serving villages northwest of Aylesbury, England. It also serves the Berryfields and Weedon Hill housing developments north of the town.  The station and all trains serving it are operated by Chiltern Railways.

Background
Aylesbury Vale Parkway is on the former Metropolitan and Great Central Joint Railway, which formed part of the Great Central Main Line route linking London and Aylesbury with the East Midlands and North. The Office of the Deputy Prime Minister announced in April 2006 that it would provide £8.17 million for track and signalling improvements to the existing line, which then was only used to carry freight. A further £2.8 million was invested by Chiltern Railways' owners Laing Rail and £1 million by Buckinghamshire County Council.

Construction began in October 2007 and the rail works were completed by Carillion Rail.

The station was originally not due to be completed until 2010 but actually opened on 14 December 2008 although the station building did not open until 1 June 2009. In the interim while the station buildings were being completed, tickets and facilities were provided from Portakabins.

Services and facilities
Aylesbury Vale Parkway has links to existing public transport bus services along the A41 corridor. A bus service from the station to several villages north of Aylesbury began on 15 December 2008. Other bus journeys include the Green Route 4 of the Rainbow Routes served by Redline Buses and very infrequent services to and from Bicester on the route 18 run by Langston & Tasker. The station has a taxi rank, car park, a charging point for electric vehicles and parking bays for motorcycles and pedal cycles.

The off-peak train service is one departure per hour to Marylebone via . In peak periods there are up to three trains per hour to Marylebone. The journey time to Aylesbury is about four minutes.

Plans

However, in November 2020 it was reported that this service may be dropped from the first phase. 

, trains between Aylesbury and  cannot serve Aylesbury Vale Parkway as there is no platform on the through route.
In the East West Rail consultation it was proposed that the station would have two new through platforms and a terminating platform for terminating services to and for trains to Marylebone.

It was proposed that, if services are extended to the north, trains between Milton Keynes Central and Marylebone would run via  and not Amersham.

In March 2021, the East West Rail Company announced that its opening plans for East West Rail have changed, notably deferring indefinitely a connection to Aylesbury.

See also
East West Rail Consortium

References

External links

 Chiltern Railways station page
 East West Rail Consortium

Railway stations in Buckinghamshire
DfT Category E stations
Railway stations opened by Network Rail
Railway stations in Great Britain opened in 2008
Railway stations served by Chiltern Railways
Vale Parkway railway station
East West Rail